Joculator bicinctus is a species of minute sea snails, marine gastropod molluscs in the family Cerithiopsidae. It was described by Cecalupo and Perugia in 2012.

Distribution
This marine species occurs off Papua New Guinea.

References

 Cecalupo A. & Perugia I. (2012) Family Cerithiopsidae H. Adams & A. Adams, 1853 in the central Philippines (Caenogastropoda: Triphoroidea). Quaderni della Civica Stazione Idrobiologica di Milano 30: 1-262
 Cecalupo A. & Perugia I. (2017). Cerithiopsidae and Newtoniellidae (Gastropoda: Triphoroidea) from New Caledonia, western Pacific. Visaya. suppl. 7: 1-175
 Cecalupo A. & Perugia I. (2018). New species of Cerithiopsidae (Gastropoda: Triphoroidea) from Papua New Guinea (Pacific Ocean). Visaya. suppl. 11: 1-187.

Gastropods described in 2012
bicinctus